The Château de Ballon is an historic castle in Ballon, Sarthe, Pays de la Loire, France.

History
The castle was built in the 15th and 16th centuries.

Architectural significance
It has been listed as an official monument since 1923.

See also
Wynebald de Ballon
Hamelin de Ballon

References

Châteaux in Sarthe
Monuments historiques of Pays de la Loire